Jane Thynne (born 5 April 1961) is a British novelist, journalist and broadcaster.

Biography
Jane Thynne was born in Venezuela on 5 April 1961. She attended Lady Eleanor Holles School in London. She read English at St Anne's College, Oxford, gaining a BA degree. She was married to fellow novelist Philip Kerr until his death in 2018, and they had three children together.

Career
Thynne has worked as a journalist for the BBC,  The Sunday Times, The Daily Telegraph, and The Independent, for which she was the radio critic from October 2008 to November 2011. 

She has been a panelist on the BBC Radio 4 literary panel game The Write Stuff on many occasions.

Thynne was a member of the judging panel for the Oldie of the Year award in 2010, won by Joanna Lumley, and in 2011, won by Barry Humphries. She was also a judge for the Best Online Only Audio Drama award of the first BBC Audio Drama Awards in 2012, won by Tim Fountain for Rock.

Her first novel, Patrimony, was published in 1997. This was followed by The Shell House (1999), The Weighing of the Heart (2010) and Black Roses (2013).

Bibliography

References

External links
 
  (includes a picture of Thynne and her daughter)
 
 

1961 births
Living people
Alumni of St Anne's College, Oxford
English women journalists
English women novelists
People educated at Lady Eleanor Holles School
Radio critics
21st-century English novelists
English journalists
21st-century English women writers
English women non-fiction writers